Jeffrey Bertrand Blake (born December 4, 1970) is an American former professional football player who was a quarterback in the National Football League (NFL) for 14 seasons. Blake was a member of seven teams during his career, playing his longest stint with the Cincinnati Bengals from 1994 to 1999. Prior to his five seasons in Cincinnati, he was selected in the sixth round of the 1992 NFL Draft by the New York Jets, with whom he was a member of for two seasons. He spent the second half of his career playing for the New Orleans Saints from 2000 to 2001 and one season each with the Baltimore Ravens, Arizona Cardinals, Philadelphia Eagles, and Chicago Bears.

During his Bengals tenure, Blake was selected to the Pro Bowl in 1995. He holds the record for the longest Pro Bowl touchdown at 92 yards.

Career

College career
Blake finished sixth in the 1991 Heisman Trophy voting, while leading East Carolina to an 11–1 record and the #9 ranking at season's end. He was inducted into the East Carolina Hall of Fame in 2007.

1990: 116/219 for 1,510 yards with 13 TD vs. 10 INT. 118 carries for 414 yards with 4 TD.
1991: 203/368 for 3,073 yards with 28 TD vs. 8 INT. 77 carries for 109 yards with 3 TD.

Professional career

Blake's best seasons came with Cincinnati in the mid-to-late 1990s (when he was often referred to as "Shake-N-Blake" by local media and fans); he established great rapport with Bengal receivers Carl Pickens and Darnay Scott, helping the former vie for the receiving title in 1995.

Blake left the Bengals after the 1999 season. He signed with the New Orleans Saints as a free agent. Blake started 11 games at quarterback before breaking his foot late in the 2000 season and being replaced by Aaron Brooks.

Blake left the Saints after the 2001 season. He started 11 games for the Ravens in 2002 and 13 games for the Cardinals in 2003, but neither team expressed interest in signing him to a long-term contract.

Blake was signed by the Chicago Bears before the 2005 NFL season to replace back-up quarterback Chad Hutchinson. Following an injury to the Bears' starting quarterback, Rex Grossman, coach Lovie Smith opted to select rookie Kyle Orton to fill the slot. During the last game of the regular NFL season, Blake was put in to replace Kyle Orton during the fourth quarter, completing eight of nine passes.

Despite stating that he wished to continue playing for the Bears and work with Grossman, the Bears did not express any interest in re-signing Blake. His contract with the team expired before the start of the 2006 NFL season. His position was filled by Kyle Orton, who was demoted after the Bears signed Brian Griese to serve as Grossman's back-up. At the conclusion of his fourteen-year career, Blake amassed 21,711 passing yards, with 134 touchdown passes, and 99 interceptions. A mobile quarterback, Blake ran for 2,027 career rushing yards and 14 touchdowns. He made 100 career starts.

References

External links

1970 births
Living people
Seminole High School (Seminole County, Florida) alumni
African-American players of American football
American football quarterbacks
New York Jets players
Cincinnati Bengals players
New Orleans Saints players
Baltimore Ravens players
Arizona Cardinals players
Philadelphia Eagles players
Chicago Bears players
American Conference Pro Bowl players
East Carolina Pirates football players
Sportspeople from Daytona Beach, Florida
People from Daytona Beach, Florida
Players of American football from Florida
21st-century African-American sportspeople
20th-century African-American sportspeople